Robert Perkins may refer to:

Robert Perkins (actor) (born 1966), British actor in the television series The Bill
Robert Perkins (architect), American architect
Robert Perkins (artist) (born 1949), American artist, filmmaker and writer
Robert Perkins (MP), British Conservative MP for Stroud
Robert Perkins, co-producer of the Ricky Martin song "It's Alright"
Robert Irvin Perkins (1898–1992), politician in Saskatchewan, Canada
Robert Cyril Layton Perkins (1866–1955), British entomologist
Bob Perkins (judge), American judge
Bob Perkins (radio personality) (born 1933), American radio personality